José Vicente Ferrer de Otero y Cintrón<ref>"Jose Ferrer (American actor)" Encyclopædia Britannica. Retrieved on 2012-05-12.</ref> (January 8, 1912 – January 26, 1992) was a Puerto Rican actor and director of stage, film and television. He was one of the most celebrated and esteemed Hispanic American actors—or, indeed, actors of any ethnicity—during his lifetime, and after, with a career spanning nearly 60 years between 1935 and 1992. He achieved prominence for his portrayal of Cyrano de Bergerac in the play of the same name, which earned him the inaugural Tony Award for Best Actor in a Play in 1947. He reprised the role in a 1950 film version and won an Academy Award, making him the first Hispanic actor and the first Puerto Rican-born to win an Oscar.

His other notable film roles include Charles VII in Joan of Arc (1948), Henri de Toulouse-Lautrec in Moulin Rouge (1952), defense attorney Barney Greenwald in The Caine Mutiny (1954), Alfred Dreyfus in I Accuse! (1958), which he also directed; the Turkish Bey in Lawrence of Arabia (1962), Siegfried Rieber in Ship of Fools (1965), and Emperor Shaddam IV in Dune (1984). Ferrer also maintained a prolific acting and directing career on Broadway, winning a second Best Actor Tony for The Shrike, and Best Director for The Shrike, The Fourposter, and Stalag 17.Ferrer was the father of actor Miguel Ferrer, the brother of Rafael Ferrer, the grandfather of actress Tessa Ferrer, and the uncle of actor George Clooney. His contributions to American theatre were recognized in 1981, when he was inducted into the American Theater Hall of Fame. In 1985, he received the National Medal of Arts from President Reagan, becoming the first actor so honored.

Early life
Ferrer was born in San Juan, Puerto Rico, the son of Rafael Ferrer, a local attorney and writer, and María Providencia Cintrón, of Yabucoa. He was the grandson of Gabriel Ferrer Hernández, a doctor and advocate of Puerto Rican independence from Spain. He had two younger sisters, Elvira and Leticia.

The family moved to New York in 1914, when Ferrer was two years old. He studied at the Swiss boarding school Institut Le Rosey. He was adept in several languages, including Spanish, English, French, and Italian.

In 1933, Ferrer completed his bachelor's degree in architecture at Princeton University, where he wrote his senior thesis on "French Naturalism and Pardo Bazán". Ferrer was also a member of the Princeton Triangle Club and played piano in a band, "José Ferrer and His Pied Pipers". Ferrer then studied Romance languages at Columbia University for 1934–35.

Career

Theatre

Ferrer's first professional appearance as an actor was at a "showboat" theater on Long Island in the summer of 1934.

In 1935, Ferrer was the stage manager at the Suffern Country Playhouse, operated by Joshua Logan, whom Ferrer had known at Princeton. Ruth Gordon and Helen Hayes recommended him to Jed Harris.
 
Ferrer made his Broadway debut in 1935 in A Slight Case of Murder which ran 69 performances.

He could also be seen in Stick-in-the-Mud (1935) and Spring Dance (1936). Ferrer's first big success was in Brother Rat (1936–38) which ran for 577 performances. In Clover only ran for three performances. How to Get Tough About It (1938) also had a short run, as did Missouri Legend (1938).Mamba's Daughters (1939) ran for 163 performances. Ferrer followed it with Key Largo (1939–40) with Paul Muni and directed by Guthrie McClintic, which went for 105 shows and was later turned into a film.

Ferrer had a huge personal success in the title role of Charley's Aunt (1940–41), partly in drag, under the direction of Joshua Logan. It went for 233 performances.

Ferrer then replaced Danny Kaye in the musical Let's Face It! (1943).

Theatre director and Cyrano
Ferrer made his debut on Broadway as director with Vickie (1942) in which he also starred. It only had a short run.

He played Iago in Margaret Webster's Broadway production of Othello (1943–44), which starred Paul Robeson in the title role, Webster as Emilia, and Ferrer's wife, Uta Hagen, as Desdemona. That production still holds the record for longest-running repeat performance of a Shakespearean play presented in the United States, going for 296 performances (it would be revived in 1945).

Ferrer produced and directed, but did not appear in, Strange Fruit (1945–46), starring Mel Ferrer (no relation).

Among other radio roles, Ferrer starred as detective Philo Vance in a 1945 series of the same name.

Cyrano de Bergerac

Ferrer may be best remembered for his performance in the title role of Cyrano de Bergerac, which he first played on Broadway in 1946. Ferrer feared that the production would be a failure in rehearsals, due to the open dislike for the play by director Mel Ferrer (no relation), so he called in Joshua Logan (who had directed his star-making performance in Charley's Aunt) to serve as "play doctor" for the production. Logan wrote that he simply had to eliminate pieces of business which director Ferrer had inserted in his staging; they presumably were intended to sabotage the more sentimental elements of the play that the director considered to be corny and in bad taste. The production became one of the hits of the 1946/47 Broadway season, winning Ferrer the first Best Actor Tony Award for his depiction of the long-nosed poet/swordsman.

On January 9, 1949, Ferrer made his television debut when he starred in The Philco Television Playhouse's one-hour adaptation of the play.  

Ferrer directed, but did not appear in, As We Forgive Our Debtors (1947), which ran 5 performances. There was another short run for Volpone (1947) which Ferrer adapted and played the title role.

Early films
Ferrer made his film debut in the Technicolor epic Joan of Arc (1948) as the weak-willed Dauphin opposite Ingrid Bergman as Joan. Ferrer's performance earned him an Oscar nomination for Best Supporting Actor.

At the City Center, he acted in revivals of Angel Street (1948) and The Alchemist (1948) and directed S. S. Glencairn (1948) and The Insect Comedy (1948) (also appearing in the latter).

Ferrer had another Broadway hit with The Silver Whistle (1948–49) which ran for 219 performances. He performed two shows for The Philco-Goodyear Television Playhouse on TV in 1949: Cyrano, playing the title role, and an adaptation of What Makes Sammy Run?, playing Sammy Glick (adapted by Paddy Chayefsky).

Ferrer returned to Hollywood to appear in Otto Preminger's Whirlpool (1950), supporting Gene Tierney, and Richard Brooks' Crisis (1950), opposite Cary Grant.

Film stardom
Ferrer then played the title role in Cyrano de Bergerac (1950), directed by Michael Gordon and produced by Stanley Kramer. Ferrer won the Best Actor Oscar. The film was widely seen although it lost money. Ferrer donated the Oscar to the University of Puerto Rico, and it was subsequently stolen in 2000.
 
Ferrer returned to Broadway for a revival of Twentieth Century (1950–51) which he directed and starred in, opposite Gloria Swanson; it went for 233 performances.  Immediately following, he produced and directed, but did not appear in, Stalag 17 (1951–52), a big hit running for 472 performances. Even more popular was The Fourposter (1951–53) in which he directed Hume Cronyn and Jessica Tandy; it ran for 632 performances.

Ferrer returned to cinema screens in the comedy Anything Can Happen (1952), directed by George Seaton, where Ferrer played an immigrant.

More popular was Moulin Rouge (1952) in which Ferrer played the role of Toulouse-Lautrec under John Huston's direction. Ferrer received 40% of the profits.

Back on Broadway, Ferrer directed and starred in The Shrike (1952), which ran for 161 performances.

His next two shows were as director only: Horton Foote's The Chase (1952) only had a short run but My Three Angels (1953–54), went for 344 performances.

Ferrer had another cinema hit with Miss Sadie Thompson (1953) starring Rita Hayworth. Ferrer briefly revived some of his shows at the City Centre in 1953: Cyrano, The Shrike, Richard III, Charley's Aunt.

He returned to films with The Caine Mutiny (1954) for Kramer, co-starring with Humphrey Bogart and Van Johnson, playing defense lawyer Barney Greenwald; the film was a huge hit. Greenwald's Jewish faith, so prominent in the novel that it informed his judgments of the U.S.S. Caine's officers, was downplayed in the film, as Ferrer, being Puerto Rican, was nominally Roman Catholic.

Also popular was Deep in My Heart (1955) where Ferrer played Sigmund Romberg, and which made a profit of over $1 million.

Film director
Ferrer made his debut as film director at Universal with an adaptation of The Shrike (1955), in which he also starred opposite June Allyson.

Ferrer then performed Cyrano in an episode of Producer's Showcase on television, directed by Mel Ferrer and co-starring Claire Bloom.

He went to England to star in and direct a war film for Warwick Productions, The Cockleshell Heroes (1955), alongside Trevor Howard; it was a success at the British box office.

Ferrer co-wrote, directed and starred in the film The Great Man (1956), at Universal. He directed and starred in two films for MGM: I Accuse! (1958), where he played Captain Alfred Dreyfus, and The High Cost of Loving (1958) a comedy with Gena Rowlands. Both flopped at the box office.

Back on Broadway, Ferrer co-wrote and directed the stage musical Oh, Captain! (1958) with Tony Randall, which only had a short run. He directed and starred in Edwin Booth (1958), playing the title role; it was not a success.

In 1958, Ferrer narrated the children's album Tubby the Tuba, which was nominated for the Best Recording For Children at the 1st Annual Grammy Awards.

Ferrer took over the direction of the troubled musical Juno (1959) from Vincent J. Donehue, who had himself taken over from Tony Richardson. The show, which starred Shirley Booth, folded after 16 performances and mixed-to extremely negative critical reaction.

However, he followed it directing the original stage production of Saul Levitt's The Andersonville Trial (1959–60), about the trial following the revelation of conditions at the infamous Civil War prison. It was a hit and featured George C. Scott, running for 179 performances.

Around this time, Ferrer also appeared in television in episodes of General Electric Theater and The United States Steel Hour.

20th Century Fox
Ferrer signed a contract with 20th Century Fox to direct films. He made Return to Peyton Place (1961) and State Fair (1962), both of which were commercial disappointments.

Ferrer had a key support role in the film Lawrence of Arabia (1962) which was a huge success. Although Ferrer's performance was only small he said it was his best on screen.

At Fox, he played an investigating police officer in Nine Hours to Rama (1963). He also guest starred on The Greatest Show on Earth.

Ferrer returned to Broadway to star in Noël Coward's musical The Girl Who Came to Supper (1963–64) which ran for 112 performances.

He narrated the first episode of the popular 1964 sitcom Bewitched, in mock documentary style.

Ferrer went to Germany to make Stop Train 349 (1963) with Sean Flynn. He appeared in the 1964 French film Cyrano et d'Artagnan directed by Abel Gance.

Back in Hollywood, Ferrer played Herod Antipas in The Greatest Story Ever Told (1965) and was in Ship of Fools (1965) for Stanley Kramer.

A notable performance of his later stage career was as Miguel de Cervantes and his fictional creation Don Quixote in the hit musical Man of La Mancha. Ferrer took over the role from Richard Kiley in 1966 and subsequently went on tour with it in the first national company of the show. Tony Martinez continued in the role of Sancho Panza under Ferrer, as he had with Kiley.

Ferrer starred in Carl Reiner's Enter Laughing (1967) and did a production of Kismet (1967) on TV. He went to Europe to do Cervantes (1967) and appeared in A Case of Libel (1968) for US TV. He also provided the voice of the evil Ben Haramed in the 1968 Rankin/Bass Christmas TV special The Little Drummer Boy. In 1968 the IRS sent him a tax bill of $122,000 going back to 1962.

1970s
Ferrer appeared in the television films The Aquarians (1970), Gideon (1971) and Crosscurrent (1971) and guest-starred on The Name of the Game and Banyon.

Ferrer directed The Web and the Rock (1972) on stage in New York and appeared in The Marcus-Nelson Murders (1973), Orson Welles Great Mysteries (1973), and Columbo.

Around 1973, he narrated A Touch of Royalty, a documentary on the life and death of Puerto Rico's baseball star Roberto Clemente. Ferrer voiced both versions, Spanish and English.

Ferrer voiced a highly truncated cartoon version of Cyrano for an episode of The ABC Afterschool Special in 1974.

Ferrer appeared in The Missing Are Deadly (1975), Forever Young, Forever Free (1975), Order to Assassinate (1975), Medical Story (1975), The Art of Crime (1975), Truman at Potsdam (1976) (playing Stalin), The Big Bus (1976), Paco (1976)., Voyage of the Damned (1976), Crash! (1976), The Sentinel (1977), Zoltan, Hound of Dracula (1977), Exo-Man (1977), Who Has Seen the Wind (1977), The Rhinemann Exchange, The Private Files of J. Edgar Hoover (1977), Fedora (1978) from Billy Wilder, The Amazing Captain Nemo (1978) (in the title role), and The Swarm. He guest starred on Starsky and Hutch and Tales of the Unexpected.

During the Bicentennial, Ferrer narrated the world premiere of Michael Jeffrey Shapiro's A Declaration of Independence, July 4, 1776 for narrator and orchestra with Martin Rich leading the Philharmonic Symphony of Westchester.

Ferrer was a replacement cast member in a production of David Mamet's A Life in the Theatre (1977–78). He produced and starred in White Pelicans (1978) and directed Carmelina (1979) on stage but it only ran 17 performances.

He was in The Fifth Musketeer (1979), The Concorde ... Airport '79 (1979), Natural Enemies (1979), The French Atlantic Affair (1979), A Life of Sin, a 1979 film by Puerto Rican director Efraín López Neris which also starred Raul Julia, Míriam Colón and Henry Darrow, and Battles: The Murder That Wouldn't Die (1980). He did The Merchant on stage in Canada.

1980s
In 1980, he had a role as future Justice Abe Fortas in the made-for-television film version of Anthony Lewis' Gideon's Trumpet, opposite Henry Fonda in an Emmy-nominated performance as Clarence Earl Gideon.

He also appeared in Battle Creek Brawl (1980), Pleasure Palace (1980), The Dream Merchants (1980), Magnum, P.I., Evita Peron (1981), Berlin Tunnel 21 (1981), Peter and Paul (1981) with Anthony Hopkins, Bloody Birthday (1981), Woody Allen's A Midsummer Night's Sex Comedy (1982) (a classy yet somewhat antagonistic university professor/author whose booming voice both begins and ends the film), Blood Tide (1982), Blood Feud (1982), This Girl for Hire (1983), The Being (1983) and Mel Brooks's version of To Be or Not to Be (1983).

From 1982 to 1985, he was artistic director of the Coconut Grove Theatre in Miami.

He guest-starred on Quincy, M.E., Another World, Fantasy Island, Hotel, The Love Boat, Bridges to Cross, and Murder, She Wrote.

Ferrer was in The Evil That Men Do (1984), Samson and Delilah (1984), and George Washington (1984). He was the Emperor in Dune (1984) and was in Hitler's SS: Portrait in Evil (1985), Seduced (1985), Covenant (1985), Blood & Orchids (1986), Young Harry Houdini, and The Wind in the Willows (1987).

Ferrer made his farewell to Cyrano by performing a short passage from the play for the 1986 Tony Awards telecast.

Although not the original actor to play the character, Ferrer, beginning in the third season, had a recurring role as Julia Duffy's WASPy father in the long-running television series Newhart in the 1980s.

In an interview given in the 1980s, he bemoaned the lack of good character parts for aging stars, and admitted that he now took on roles mostly for the money, such as his roles in the horror potboilers The Swarm, in which he played a doctor, and Dracula's Dog, in which he played a police inspector.

Ferrer's final performances include The Sun and the Moon (1987), American Playhouse ("Strange Interlude" with Kenneth Branagh), Mother's Day (1989), Matlock, Hired to Kill (1990), Old Explorers (1990) and The Perfect Tribute.

He was cast in a Broadway play Conversations with My Father (1991) but withdrew due to poor health.

Legacy
 Ferrer was the first Hispanic actor to win an Academy Award.
 In 2005, the Hispanic Organization of Latin Actors (HOLA) renamed its Tespis Award to the HOLA José Ferrer Tespis Award.
 Ferrer was honored for his theatrical and cinematic works with an induction into the American Theatre Hall of Fame and a National Medal of Arts, becoming the first actor and Hispanic to be presented with the prestigious award.
 Ferrer's sons Rafael Ferrer and Miguel Ferrer, his daughter (Letty Ferrer), and his granddaughter Tessa Ferrer also became actors and actresses.
 Ferrer donated his Academy Award to the University of Puerto Rico. The award was stolen after being misplaced during the remodeling of the university's theater.
 On April 26, 2012, the United States Postal Service issued a stamp in Ferrer's honor in its Distinguished Americans series.

Personal life

Ferrer was married five times and had six children:

Uta Hagen (1938–1948): Ferrer and Hagen had one child, their daughter Leticia (born October 15, 1940). They divorced in 1948, partly due to Hagen's long-concealed affair with Paul Robeson, with whom Hagen and Ferrer had co-starred in the Broadway production of Othello''.
Phyllis Hill (1948–1953): Ferrer and Hill wed on May 27, 1948, and they moved to Burlington, Vermont in 1950, where they subsequently found it difficult to keep their marriage together. Ferrer returned to Puerto Rico because his mother died. They divorced on January 12, 1953.
Rosemary Clooney (1953–1961): Ferrer first married Clooney on July 13, 1953, in Durant, Oklahoma. They moved to Santa Monica, California, in 1954, and then to Los Angeles in 1958. Ferrer and Clooney had five children in quick succession: Miguel (February 7, 1955 – January 19, 2017), Maria (born August 9, 1956), Gabriel (born August 1, 1957), Monsita (born October 13, 1958) and Rafael (born March 23, 1960). They divorced for the first time in 1961.
Rosemary Clooney (1964–1967): Ferrer and Clooney remarried on November 22, 1964, in Los Angeles; however, the marriage again crumbled because Ferrer was carrying on an affair with the woman who would become his last wife, Stella Magee. Clooney found out about the affair, and she and Ferrer divorced again in 1967.
Stella Magee (1977–1992): Ferrer married Magee in 1977, and they remained together until his death in 1992.
Through his marriage to Clooney, Ferrer was the uncle of actor George Clooney, the father in law to singer Debby Boone and actress Leilani Sarelle, and the grandfather of actress Tessa Ferrer.

Death
Ferrer died of colorectal cancer in Coral Gables, Florida, on January 26, 1992, 18 days after his 80th birthday, and was interred in Santa María Magdalena de Pazzis Cemetery in Old San Juan in his native Puerto Rico.

Filmography

See also
 
 List of Puerto Ricans
 French immigration to Puerto Rico
 List of Puerto Rican Academy Award winners and nominees
 Miguel Ferrer

References

External links

 
 
 
 José Ferrer collection, Howard Gotlieb Archival Research Center, Boston University

1912 births
1992 deaths
Hispanic and Latino American male actors
Male actors from San Juan, Puerto Rico
People from Santurce, Puerto Rico
Princeton University School of Architecture alumni
Puerto Rican male stage actors
Puerto Rican male film actors
Best Actor Academy Award winners
Best Drama Actor Golden Globe (film) winners
Donaldson Award winners
Burials at Santa María Magdalena de Pazzis Cemetery
Deaths from cancer in Florida
Deaths from colorectal cancer
RCA Victor artists
United States National Medal of Arts recipients
20th-century American male actors
Ferrer family (acting)
Alumni of Institut Le Rosey
Puerto Rican people of Spanish descent